Skłoby  is a village in the administrative district of Gmina Chlewiska, within Szydłowiec County, Masovian Voivodeship, in east-central Poland.

The village has a population of 555.

History

Skłoby was a private village, administratively located in the Radom County in the Sandomierz Voivodeship in the Lesser Poland Province of the Kingdom of Poland. In the mid-15th century it was owned by the Chlewicki family.

In 1827, it had a population of 253, and in the late 19th century, it had a population of 594.

Following the joint German-Soviet invasion of Poland, which started World War II in September 1939, the town was occupied by Germany until 1945. The Polish resistance movement was active in the area. On April 11, 1940 a clash between the Germans and the Polish resistance took place at Skłoby. After the clash, German gendarmerie and Selbstschutz pacified the village. Men aged 15-60 were taken to the nearby forest and executed, while houses with old people, children and women were doused with gasoline and burned down.

References

Villages in Szydłowiec County
Massacres of Poles
Nazi war crimes in Poland